Alphaeus Patterson (March 15, 1856 – November 4, 1931) was a politician and businessman from Alberta, Canada. He was born in Kemptville, Ontario.

Business
Patterson founded a company with William Rae known as The Argonaut Company Ltd. in 1909 Patterson became President and Rae became the secretary-treasure. The company was primarily responsible for developing the site on Bear Creek that became modern Grande Prairie.

In 1911 Patterson erected the first Store building in Grande Prairie the business was known as Paterson & Son as he ran the store and a post office from the same building with his son Jack O. Patterson.

Politics
Patterson was elected to the Alberta Legislature in the 1913 Alberta general election. He ran in a hotly three-way contested race defeating former Member of the Legislative Assembly (MLA) William Bredin and against his former business partner and future MLA William Rae. He served 1 term in the Assembly as a member of the official opposition and did not run for re-election.

Patterson is the first member elected to the Alberta Legislature who lived in Grande Prairie, Alberta. He died in 1931 in North Saanich, British Columbia.

Honors
Imperial Order of the Daughters of the Empire - Alphaeus Patterson chapter which operated in Grande Prairie from 1921 to 1997 was named in his honor.

Grande Prairie College grants the I.O.D.E. Alphaeus Patterson Chapter Science Scholarship.

References

http://southpeacearchives.org/imperial-order-of-the-daughters-of-the-empire-fonds/

External links
Legislative Assembly of Alberta Members Listing

Progressive Conservative Association of Alberta MLAs
People from Grande Prairie
1931 deaths
1856 births